The Eleanor is a historic gaff-rigged racing sloop built in 1903 at the B. F. Wood shipyard, City Island, Bronx and designed by Clinton H. Crane. She is homeported at the Catskill Marina, 10 Greene St., Catskill, New York.

She was listed on the National Register of Historic Places in 1982.

Starting in 2010, Eleanor's restoration was undertaken by the Hudson River Historic Boat Restoration and Sailing Society.  The restoration was completed in 2020. The Eleanor is owned, maintained, and sailed by the Hudson River Historic Boat Restoration and Sailing Society.

References

Ships on the National Register of Historic Places in New York (state)
Individual sailing vessels
1903 ships
Sloops of the United States
Columbia County, New York
National Register of Historic Places in Columbia County, New York